Railway Track & Structures (RT&S) is an American trade journal for the rail transport industry, focusing on the fields of railroad engineering, communication and maintenance. It was founded in 1905 as Railway Engineering & Maintenance and is published monthly by Simmons-Boardman Publishing Corporation.

See also
 List of railroad-related periodicals

References

Railway Track & Structures archive at HathiTrust

1905 establishments in the United States
Monthly magazines published in the United States
Rail transport magazines published in the United States
Magazines established in 1905
Magazines published in Connecticut